Carmel River State Beach is a state park unit at the mouth of Carmel Valley, California, United States, featuring a  protected beach with a lagoon formed by the Carmel River. The lagoon attracts many migratory birds. The state beach includes Mara Beach and Monastery Beach, (also called San Jose Creek Beach) which is popular with scuba divers. Sea kayakers also frequent the beach, which has easy access to the natural reserves of Point Lobos.  The  park was established in 1953.

History

In 1602 Spanish explorer Sebastián Vizcaíno landed at this beach.  Gaspar de Portolà, during the Portola expedition, was encamped on this beach and rested here before deciding to return to San Diego because of low supplies and having failed to rendezvous with the Spanish supply ships. A cross commemorating the landing is on the beach.

Recreational activities
Carmel River State Beach is a popular spot for divers and kayakers, who can access the notable kelp forests in the area.  It is also popular with birders, and is a stop on the Central Coast Birding Trail. The best seasons for birdwatching at Carmel River State Beach are fall and winter.

Swimming on this section of the coast can be extremely dangerous because of the strong currents. Carmel River State Beach is considered especially dangerous for swimming as the steep drop-off from shore can minimize turbulent waves giving the mistaken impression of a calm sea.

Dogs are allowed in the park, but must be kept on a leash.

Ecology

South of the Carmel River Lagoon and Wetlands Natural Preserve, great blue heron, greater yellowlegs, brown pelicans, Virginia rail, and many species of gulls, terns, and egrets can be spotted.   A variety of dune flora and fauna can also be found here, as well as organisms inhabiting the rocky intertidal and sandy  intertidal zones.

Location
The park enterence is located off Carmel Point, at Scenic Road and Carmelo Street.

The beach is open to walk-in visitors, and has public restrooms next to the parking lot.

See also
 List of beaches in California
 List of California state parks
 List of California State Beaches

References

External links
 Carmel River State Beach
 Monastery Beach

  

1953 establishments in California
California State Beaches
Parks in Monterey County, California
Protected areas established in 1953
Beaches of Monterey County, California
Beaches of Northern California